Elliot Weisgarber (1919 - 2001) was a composer, clarinetist and ethnomusicologist at the University of British Columbia from 1960 to 1984.

Education
Weisgarber studied clarinet with Rosario Mazzeo of the Boston Symphony and Gustave Langenus of New York. He went on to earn his performer's certificate at the Eastman School of Music (where he studied with Rufus Mont Arey) as well as bachelor's (1942) and master's (1943) degrees in composition. His composition teachers included Edward Royce, Bernard Rogers, Nadia Boulanger and Halsey Stevens.

Career
Between 1944 and 1960 he taught at the Woman's College of the University of North Carolina.

In 1960 Weisgarber joined the faculty of the Music Department at the University of British Columbia in Vancouver, Canada where he spent the remainder of his life and career. From 1966 to 1969 he was the recipient of several Canada Council grants for the purpose of studying Japanese music in Japan where he became proficient in playing the shakuhachi. In 1974 he was a guest speaker at the Asian Composers' League conference in Kyoto and also participated in the UNESCO/ISME seminar in Tokyo. Two years later he addressed the Asian Composers' League again, this time in Taiwan, prior to which he had been a guest lecturer and visiting composer at the National University of Teheran. Weisgarber retired in 1984 and continued to compose until the time of his death.

Compositions
Weisgarber's catalog of compositions consists of 450 separate works from short songs to symphonies, as well as a number of scores for film, radio and television. His style of composition reflects the depth of his Asian experience as well as the traditions of his western musical education. Examples of his work housed at the Canadian Music Centre include:
Colloquies (flute & orchestra)
Concerto for viola and string orchestra (1957)
Five Pieces for Bassoon & Piano
Kyoto Landscapes (large orchestra)
Night (chorus & string quartet plus double bass)
Quartet No. 6 (string quartet)
Quintet "Aotearoa" (clarinet & string quartet)
Seven Poems by Robinson Jeffers (voice & piano)
Six Hokusai Miniatures (violin & piano)
Woodwind Quintet

Discography
Elliot Weisgarber, Night, Vancouver Chamber Choir, Centrediscs, Canadian Music Centre, WRC8-6403, 1990
Elliot Weisgarber, Sonatine, Playing Tribute Aulos Trio, CanSona Arts Media, 1998.
Elliot Weisgarber, Immanences, Erica Northcott, soprano; Rena Sharon, piano; Laura Butler Frank, soprano; Peter Breykin, piano, Hermissenda Recordings HR0214, 1998 
Elliot Weisgarber, Miyako Sketches, Coastal Waves, Canadian Music Centre, WRC8-7233, 1998

Writings
The Honkyoku of the Kinko-Ryu: Some Principles of its Organization, Journal of the Society for Ethnomusicology, vol. 12 no. 3, Sept. 1968
Mayonnaise on the Sashimi, Canadian Composer, 44, Nov. 1969
A Composer Explains his "Trans-cultural" Music, Canadian Composer, 88, Feb. 1974

Unpublished Work
A Walk From the Mountain: A Search for a Lost Genius: a biography of pianist and composer Aurelio Giorni, 1895-1938

Repositories of his Work
In addition to the finished scores at the Canadian Music Centre, the University Archives at the University of British Columbia's Irving K. Barber Learning Centre house a large collection of his original manuscripts and sketches.

Additional Resource
 Elliot Weisgarber: Catalog of Works, compiled by Karen Suzanne Smithson, 2002

References 

Canadian composers
Canadian male composers
Canadian clarinetists
Ethnomusicologists
1919 births
2001 deaths
20th-century musicologists
20th-century Canadian male musicians
American emigrants to Canada